Dumbleton is a rural locality in the Mackay Region, Queensland, Australia. In the  Dumbleton had a population of 242 people.

History 
Dumbleton State School opened on 1926 and closed circa 1949.

In the  Dumbleton had a population of 242 people.

References 

Mackay Region
Localities in Queensland